Idaea degeneraria, the Portland ribbon wave, is a moth of the family Geometridae. The species was first described by Jacob Hübner in 1799.

Subspecies
In alphabetical order:
 Idaea degeneraria alticolaria (Schawerda, 1933)
 Idaea degeneraria degeneraria (Hubner, 1800)
 Idaea degeneraria erschoffi (Christoph, 1872)

Description

The species has a wingspan of 26–31 mm. These small pale brown geometers are darker brown-marked between antemedian and median lines.

Biology
The larvae feed on various low herbaceous plants, mainly dandelion (Taraxacum species) and knotgrass (Polygonum species). The adults fly in one generation from June to July.

Distribution
This species can be found in most of Europe, in the Near East and in North Africa. These moths prefer warm limestone undercliffs.

Notes
The flight season refers to the British Isles. This may vary in other parts of its range.

References

 Guliyeva, Hokuma Ecological-Physiological Characteristics of the Absheron Population of Idaea degeneraria Hubn. (Lepidoptera, Geometridae)

External links
Portland ribbon wave at UKMoths
Lepiforum e.V.

Sterrhini
Moths described in 1799
Moths of Africa
Moths of Europe
Moths of the Middle East
Taxa named by Jacob Hübner